He Tongshuai (born 27 November 1999) is a Chinese footballer who plays as a midfielder for Wuhan Three Towns.

Club career
He Tongshuai would play for the Shandong Taishan youth team before being allowed to join third tier club Zibo Cuju on loan on 13 July 2018. This would be followed by a permanent move to Zibo the next season on 23 February 2019. He would go on to establish himself as a vital member of the team and would help them earn promotion to the Chinese second tier at the end of the 2020 China League Two campaign. He would not remain with the club and on 12 April 2021 he would join another second tier club in Beijing Sport University. This would be followed by his debut in a league game against Kunshan on 25 April 2021 in a 2-2 draw. He would struggle to gain much more playing time and after only four appearances without scoring a goal he would leave the club on 30 July 2021 to sign for Chinese third tier club Dongguan United.     

On 13 April 2022, he signed with newly promoted top tier side Wuhan Three Towns. He would go on to make his debut on 17 November 2022, in a Chinese FA Cup game against Dandong Tengyue, which ended in a 5-1 victory. This would be followed by his first league game for them on 4 December 2022 against Cangzhou Mighty Lions, which ended in a 4-0 victory. Throughout the season the season he would go on to establish himself as a squad player within the team that won the 2022 Chinese Super League title.

Career statistics
.

Honours

Club
Wuhan Three Towns
Chinese Super League: 2022.

References

External links
  
 

1999 births
Association football midfielders
Beijing Sport University F.C. players
China League One players
China League Two players
Chinese footballers
Chinese Super League players
Living people
People from Zhongxiang
Wuhan Three Towns F.C. players
Zibo Cuju F.C. players